BCL2/adenovirus E1B 19 kDa protein-interacting protein 2 is a protein that in humans is encoded by the BNIP2 gene.

Function 

This gene is a member of the BCL2/adenovirus E1B 19 kd-interacting protein (BNIP) family.  Though the specific function is unknown, it interacts with the E1B 19 kDa protein which is responsible for the protection of virally induced cell death, as well as E1B 19 kDa-like sequences of BCL-2, also an apoptotic protector.

Interactions
BNIP2 has been shown to interact with:
 ARHGAP1, 
 Bcl-2, and
 CDC42.

References

External links

Further reading